Aswan International Airport ,  is a domestic airport (despite its name)  located 16 km southwest of Aswan, Egypt. It was built in 1956 and upgraded in 1992 and 1999 by the Egyptian government.

Airlines and destinations
The following airlines operate regular scheduled passenger flights at Aswan Airport:

Accidents and incidents
 In October 1963, a Soviet Union military transport plane crashed at the airport, killing 14 people.
 20 March 1969, a United Arab Airlines Il-18 crashed while attempting to land at Aswan International Airport. 100 of the 105 passengers and crew on board died.

See also
 Transport in Egypt
 List of airports in Egypt

References

External links
 
 
 

Aswan
Airports in Egypt